John Coon may refer to:
 John Coon (sailor), Australian sailor
 John Saylor Coon, professor of mechanical engineering and drawing
 John Elton Coon, member of the Louisiana House of Representatives